Lisa Brokop (born June 6, 1973) is a Canadian country music singer/songwriter and actress. Active since 1990 in the country music field, she has released a total of seven studio albums and has charted more than twenty singles on the country music charts in her native Canada. Several of these singles have also crossed over to the American country music charts, although she has not entered the Top 40 in the U.S.; her highest charting songs, "Give Me a Ring Sometime" and "Take That", both peaked at No. 52 in 1994. Her highest chart single is the No. 8 "Better Off Broken" from 1999 in Canada.

Career

Early life
Lisa Brokop was born in Surrey, British Columbia in 1973. By age seven, Brokop was performing on stage with her accordion-playing mother, performing polkas and numerous country music songs.  When Brokop was twelve years old, she began sitting in with bands throughout Vancouver, British Columbia and joined a touring band in when she was 15. In 1990, when Brokop was only 17 years old, she issued her debut single, "Daddy, Sing to Me". The song managed to reach the top 10 of the Canadian RPM Country Tracks chart. Her debut album, My Love, was issued the following year on the independent Libre Records label. In June 1991, Brokop graduated from the Princess Margaret Secondary School in her hometown of Surrey; she then proceeded to move south to Nashville, Tennessee to further her country music career.

1994–1999: Breakthrough success

In 1992, Brokop began performing in local clubs and caught the attention of The Nashville Network. The network began to play Brokop's video for her single "Time to Come Back Home" and had her as a guest on The Ralph Emery Show. The appearance on The Ralph Emery Show and a 30-minute showcase at a local club got Brokop a record deal with Patriot Records, a label owned by Liberty Records. Before Brokop began recording her second album, she starred alongside Hoyt Axton in the 1994 film Harmony Cats, where she played a country singer who leaves home in search of a big break in Nashville. Brokop contributed to the movie's soundtrack and her cover of Tammy Wynette's 1968 number one hit "Stand by Your Man" was issued as a single, peaking at No. 88 on the Canadian RPM Country Tracks chart.

The first single of Brokop's second album, "Give Me a Ring Sometime", was issued in June 1994. The single cracked the top 20 in Canada, but only reached No. 52 on the U.S. Billboard Hot Country Singles & Tracks chart. Nevertheless, her first major label album, Every Little Girl's Dream, was released in September 1994. While "Give Me a Ring Sometime" was charting, many Canadian radio stations refused to play Brokop's music after the Canadian Radio-television and Telecommunications Commission ruled that "Give Me a Ring Sometime" did not have a sufficient amount of Canadian content in the song. Nevertheless, Brokop's album went on to produce two more top 40 singles in Canada with "Take That" and "One of Those Nights". By 1995, the album had been certified Gold by the CRIA, for sales of 50,000 copies. Also in 1995, Brokop, along with fellow singers Victoria Shaw and Chely Wright, received a nomination for Top New Female Vocalist at the Academy of Country Music awards, but lost to Chely Wright.

In 1995, Patriot Records had been shut down and Brokop was transferred to Capitol Nashville and issued her third album, Lisa Brokop, the following year. None of the album's first two singles reached the top 40 in Canada or the United States and the album's third, "West of Crazy", did not chart at all. The failure of the album left Brokop burned out and she then ended her relationship with Capitol to take time off to focus on songwriting.

In 1998, Brokop signed with the Nashville division of Columbia Records, where she released the single "How Do I Let Go". The song reached the top 20 of the RPM Country Tracks chart and received a nomination for SOCAN Song of the Year at the Canadian Country Music Association awards that year. Her album, When You Get to Be You, was released in July 1998 in Canada and produced five more singles including the No. 21-peaking "What's Not to Love" and "Better Off Broken", the latter becoming Brokop's highest charting single, peaking at No. 8 on the Canadian RPM Country Tracks chart in 1999. The album was scheduled for release in the United States in 1998, but was not released due to the poor performance of the album's four American singles and Brokop departed Columbia by the end of 1999.

2000 – present: Continued success
In 2000, Brokop ventured on her own and launched the Cosmo Records label where she released her fifth album, Undeniable. The album's first single, "Something Undeniable", had reached No. 18 on the country charts in Canada when RPM had been shut down. In 2001, Brokop received two Canadian Country Music Association awards for Independent Song of the Year for "Something Undeniable" and Independent Female Artist of the Year. The album's third single, "I'd Like to See You Try", won Brokop Independent Song of the Year again in 2002. She also was awarded Independent Female Artist of the Year again in 2002 and 2003.

In 2004, in an attempt to have success in the United States, Brokop signed with Asylum-Curb and issued her first single for the label, "Wildflower". The song failed to chart in the United States. An album, Hey, Do You Know Me, followed in January 2005 in Canada. The album was never released in the United States due to the failure of the first single. Shortly before departing Asylum-Curb in 2005, Brokop released the single "Big Picture" in Canada and the United States; it was never included on any album.

After a three-year hiatus, Brokop went back in the studio to record her seventh album, Beautiful Tragedy. The album was released in August 2008 on the independent Ellbea Records label and featured the hit "Break It". Eleven of the album's twelve tracks were co-written by Brokop and all tracks were produced by Brokop and her husband, country singer Paul Jefferson.

Brokop and husband Paul Jefferson have begun performing as The Jeffersons and released their debut album as a duo in 2011. The album has since released three singles in Canada: "Find the Sun," "Crazy On Me" and a country cover of The Wallflowers' 1996 song, "One Headlight".

In July 2013, Brokop signed a new deal with RareSpark media group to begin working on a new solo album. A new single, "Let It Burn" was released to Canadian Country radio on September 23.

Brokop's newest album, The Patsy Cline Project, was released on August 1, 2015. It includes seven Patsy Cline songs and three originals.

Personal life
Lisa Brokop married her boyfriend of four years, Paul Jefferson, a fellow country singer and music producer on May 25, 2008. The history of their relationship was documented on the CMT Canada/GAC TV series, Our Song, the episode aired in March 2009 in on CMT Canada. Jefferson helped Brokop "shape the stripped-down songs of [the album] Beautiful Tragedy in the couple's Nashville home studio." Brokop stated in 2008 that she and a small band were planning "to tour Canada's western provinces next January and February [2009], with a possible stop in Surrey." In February 2009, Brokop announced on stage that she was pregnant and, on August 7, 2009, Brokop and Jefferson welcomed the birth of their first child, Ivy Jefferson.

Discography

1991: My Love
1994: Every Little Girl's Dream
1996: Lisa Brokop
1998: When You Get to Be You
2000: Undeniable
2005: Hey, Do You Know Me
2008: Beautiful Tragedy
2015: The Patsy Cline Project

References

External links
 
 Lisa Brokop at IMDB.com

1973 births
Canadian women country singers
Capitol Records artists
Columbia Records artists
Curb Records artists
Liberty Records artists
Living people
People from Surrey, British Columbia
Musicians from British Columbia
20th-century Canadian women singers
21st-century Canadian women singers